
Year 118 BC was a year of the pre-Julian Roman calendar. At the time it was known as the Year of the Consulship of Cato and Rex (or, less frequently, year 636 Ab urbe condita) and the Fifth Year of Yuanshou. The denomination 118 BC for this year has been used since the early medieval period, when the Anno Domini calendar era became the prevalent method in Europe for naming years.

Events 
 By place 

 Roman Republic 
 The Roman colony of Narbo Martius is founded in Gallia Transalpina.
 The Second Dalmatian War ends with victory for Rome. Lucius Caecilius Metellus assumes the surname Delmaticus.

 Numidia 
 Micipsa dies and Numidia, following the king's wish, is divided into three parts, a third each ruled by Micipsa's own sons, Adherbal and Hiempsal I, and the king's adopted son, Jugurtha.

 China 
 Emperor Wu of Han secretly executes his favourite necromancer Shao Weng for fraud.

Births 
 Lucius Licinius Lucullus, Roman consul (d. 56 BC)

Deaths 
 Marcus Porcius Cato, Roman consul and orator
 Micipsa, king of Numidia (approximate date)

References